Third Ear Band was the second album by the Third Ear Band, released in 1970.  It consists of four improvised pieces, "Air", "Earth", "Fire", and "Water", and is therefore sometimes known as "Elements".

Track listing
All compositions by Coff, Minns, Smith and Sweeney.

 "Air" – 10:30
 "Earth" – 9:53
 "Fire" – 9:19
 "Water" – 7:04

Personnel
 Paul Minns – oboe
 Glen Sweeney – percussion
 Ursula Smith – cello
 Richard Coff – violin and viola

References 

1970 albums
Third Ear Band albums
Harvest Records albums